In telecommunication, the term homochronous describes the relationship between two signals 
such that their corresponding significant instants are displaced by a constant interval of time.

Synchronization